Beckmann is a German surname.  Notable people with the surname include:

Astrid Beckmann (born 1957), German physicist
Ernst Otto Beckmann (1853–1923), German chemist and discoverer of the Beckmann rearrangement
Johann Beckmann (1739–1811), German scientific author
Juan Domingo Beckmann (born 1967), Mexican businessman
Juan Beckmann Vidal (born 1940), Mexican businessman
Ludwig Beckmann (died 20 January 1965), German First World War flying ace
Matthias Beckmann (born 1984), German jazz musician
Max Beckmann (1884–1950), German painter
Petr Beckmann (1924–1993), Czech-American dissident physicist
Reinhold Beckmann (born 1956), German journalist and TV presenter
Rudolf Beckmann (1910–1943), German Nazi SS-Oberscharführer
Josef Beckmann (1920–2001), World War II German lieutenant

See also

Beckman (surname)
Beckman (disambiguation)

German-language surnames
German toponymic surnames